Released in 2006, Grand Illusion is the seventh studio album from Nocturnal Rites. The lyrical themes on this album focus on achieving freedom and overcoming tyranny. The album was also issued in a limited edition with a bonus DVD.

Track listing
All Songs Written & Arranged By Nocturnal Rites.

 "Fools Never Die" – 3:54
 "Never Trust" – 4:43
 "Still Alive" – 4:02
 "Something Undefined" – 4:08
 "Our Wasted Days" – 5:17
 "Cuts Like a Knife" – 5:10
 "End of our Rope" – 5:26
 "Never Ending" – 4:29
 "One by One" – 4:23
 "Deliverance" – 5:00

Bonus DVD listing
Documentary
"Fools Never Die" video
"Avalon" video
"Against the World" video
"Awakening" video

Japanese edition bonus tracks
"Fade Away"
"Under the Ice"

Personnel

Nocturnal Rites
Jonny Lindkvist – vocals
Fredrik Mannberg – rhythm guitar, backing vocals
Nils Norberg – lead guitar
Nils Eriksson – bass
 Owe Lingvall – drums

Additional personnel
 Henrik Kjellberg – keyboards and backing vocals
 Leif Grabbe – backing vocals
Ronny Hemlin  – backing vocals
L-G Persson  – backing vocals
Jens Carlsson – backing vocals
 Jens Johansson – Keyboard solo on "Cuts like a Knife"
 Henrik Danhage (Evergrey) – First guitar solo on "Cuts like a Knife"
 Kristoffer Olivius (Naglfar) – harsh vocals on "Cuts like a Knife"
 Stefan Elmgren – second guitar solo on "Never Trust"
 Per Elofsson – "pre-chorus whammy bar chaos" on "Never Trust"
 Olec Balta – First guitar solo on "Something Undefined", left channel intro for "Our Wasted Days"
 Emil Norberg (Persuader) – "pre-chorus whammy bar madness and end of song lead frenzy" on "Our Wasted Days"

Production
 Shep – producer, recording, mixing
 Henrik Kjellberg  – recording
 Mattias Eklund – engineer
Fredrik Mannberg – engineer
 Pelle Henricsson – mastering

References

2006 albums
Nocturnal Rites albums
Century Media Records albums